"Dance With Me" is the first single from Hot Rod's debut album called My Life. The song is produced by Fuego and it was released for digital download on December 16, 2010. The song is set to be released onto radios in January 2011.

Background
After six years on the record label G-Unit Records, Hot Rod finally released his debut single from his upcoming album. The single is of the Dance genre and this is because Hot Rod was influenced by this genre of music whilst out on tour in Europe. Hot Rod was refusing to tweet until the single dropped.

The song features additional vocals from Milana Leybovich on the chorus and Tommy Beringer. Also the song was created whilst he was on tour in Europe, then when he returned to America it was mixed and mastered in the studio with his boss 50 Cent.

This is the first ever song that has been officially released under G-Note Records which is subsidiary label of G-Unit Records for Pop, dance and R&B artists.

Music video
Hot Rod announced through Twitter that he would be shooting a music video for the single in January, 2011. Before the official music video was released, a music video for the song was released on YouTube with the lyrics of the song appearing on different colored backgrounds with figures of women dancing behind it.

Release information

Purchaseable release

Chart position

References

External links
 iTunes

2010 singles
Hot Rod (rapper) songs
2010 songs
G-Unit Records singles